Twisted Metal 4 is a vehicular combat video game developed by 989 Studios and published by Sony Computer Entertainment for the PlayStation. The game was released in North America on October 31, 1999 and was re-released for the Sony Greatest Hits line-up in 2000. Like the previous installment, it wasn't released in the PAL regions.

Twisted Metal 4 is the fourth installment in the Twisted Metal series and the second and last installment to be developed by 989 Studios. The game's plot centers on Sweet Tooth, the long-time mascot of the titular Twisted Metal competition, overthrowing Calypso, the mysterious organizer of the competition, in a coup d'état. He then takes over the mantle of granting the winner of the competition a single wish, regardless of price, size or even reality.

Twisted Metal 4 received mixed to positive reviews from critics, who considered it to be an improvement over the previous Twisted Metal III, particularly in terms of level design.

Gameplay
In concept, Twisted Metal 4 is a demolition derby which permits the usage of ballistic projectiles. Players choose a vehicle and an arena—or a series of arenas in the story mode—to engage in battle with opposing drivers. A variety of weapons are obtainable by pick-ups scattered throughout the stage. The objective of the game is to be the last one standing.

The game's plot takes a different turn of events compared to its predecessors. Its intro video details the tournament's story, starting around the 1900s as a circus-type caravan that traveled across the country spreading destruction everywhere. A young Sweet Tooth finds himself amazed by the contest and runs off in its pursuit, entering and eventually winning. As his wish, he desires to become the star of Twisted Metal, which Calypso gladly grants. At first revered by the chaos he created, as time went on Sweet Tooth became jealous of Calypso, until he decides to initiate a coup d'état helped by a group of midget clowns, and takes control of Twisted Metal.

It is also discovered that Calypso's source of powers comes from a mysterious ring that consumes the souls of those who die, increasing his strength and youth, and Sweet Tooth having taken it, finds that he possess the same abilities as Calypso to grant wishes. He tends to cheat people with their wishes like Calypso does as well.

Development
After a contractual dispute with the developer of the first two games in the series, SingleTrac, Twisted Metal development duties were handed over to Sony's in-house development team, 989 Studios.

In development of Twisted Metal III, the source code and physics engine for Twisted Metal 2 weren't available because they were property of SingleTrac. Therefore, new ones had to be created from scratch instead. The new source code introduced advanced physics simulation and AI techniques to the series.

In development of Twisted Metal 4, the game was reworked to improve upon the shortcomings of Twisted Metal III, introducing smoother gameplay and softer physics. Levels were expanded further and an increased arsenal of weapons was created which would ultimately become exclusive to this game.

Characters
The game includes a total of 13 selectable characters from the start. Most characters were original characters created for the game, whereas a few of the returning characters appear as stage bosses without story. Unlike previous games in the series, each stage counts with its own boss (two bosses in The Oil Rig) to defeat in order to advance. Every boss becomes selectable after defeating the story mode at least once. The musician Rob Zombie is included in the playable characters due to the large number of his songs on the previous installment in the series, Twisted Metal III.

Reception

Twisted Metal 4 received mixed to positive reviews from critics, with an aggregate score of 68.04% on GameRankings. Brian of Game Revolution considered the game to be an improvement over Twisted Metal III and noted that the level design has improved from the previous installment, but cited some unsatisfactory levels, physics problems, and the repetitive soundtrack as negative points. Joe Fielder of GameSpot also said that the game was a "huge leap" ahead of Twisted Metal III, commenting on the improved level design, control and physics, but remarked that the latter two "remain a little too touchy and unforgiving", and that the graphics, while "prettier" than those of Twisted Metal III, "aren't nearly as sharp as the graphics in its current main competitor - Activision's Vigilante 8: Second Offense". Marc Nix of IGN commented negatively on the "toy car" control, look and sound of the vehicles, but noted the "colorful" graphics and "well-done" interactive environments.

References

External links
 

1999 video games
English-language-only video games
North America-exclusive video games
PlayStation (console)-only games
Sony Interactive Entertainment games
Twisted Metal
Vehicular combat games
Video games developed in the United States
Video games set in South America
PlayStation (console) games